E74-like factor 5 (ets domain transcription factor), is a gene found in both mice and humans. In humans it is also called ESE2.

Function 

The protein encoded by this gene is a member of an epithelium-specific subclass of the ETS transcription factor family. In addition to its role in regulating the later stages of terminal differentiation of keratinocytes, it appears to regulate a number of epithelium-specific genes found in tissues containing glandular epithelium such as salivary gland and prostate. It has very low affinity to DNA due to its negative regulatory domain at the amino terminus. Two alternatively spliced transcript variants encoding different isoforms have been described for this gene.

Relevance to Disease 

A role in breast or prostate cancer is known.  There are preliminary reports that the C allele genetic variant of rs61882275 near chromosome location 11.13 with variable incidence in human populations is associated with severe COVID-19. Further investigation by others suggested the association was caused by a tissue-specific effect on ELF5 expression in lung endothelium by this allele which results in a more than 4-fold higher risk of severe COVID-19 in those with SARS-CoV2 infection.

References

Further reading

External links 
 

Transcription factors